The following routes are operated by CNYRTA's CNY Centro division, in and around the City of Syracuse and Onondaga, Cayuga, and Oswego counties.

See also 
 Syracuse metropolitan area

References

Bus routes
Bus routes